Pomaulax is a genus of sea snails, marine gastropod mollusks in the family Turbinidae, the turban snails.

Description 
The large, solid, imperforate shell has a conic shape. The periphery is carinated. The base of the shell is flattened. The umbilical tract shows a strong curved rib. The ; operculum is obovate, narrower toward the proximal extremity. Its nucleus is terminal, its outside with four strong granulose ribs radiating from the nucleus.

Species 
Species within the genus Pomaulax include:

 Pomaulax gibberosus (Dillwyn, 1817)
 Pomaulax japonicus (Dunker, 1844)
 Pomaulax spiratus (Dall, 1911)

Species brought into synonymy

 Pomaulax turbanicus Dall, 1910: synonym of Megastraea turbanica (Dall, 1910)
 Pomaulax undosum Wood, 1828: synonym of Megastraea undosa (Wood, 1828)

References 

 Williams, S.T. (2007). Origins and diversification of Indo-West Pacific marine fauna: evolutionary history and biogeography of turban shells (Gastropoda, Turbinidae). Biological Journal of the Linnean Society, 2007, 92, 573–592.
 Alf A. & Kreipl K. (2011) The family Turbinidae. Subfamilies Turbininae Rafinesque, 1815 and Prisogasterinae Hickman & McLean, 1990. In: G.T. Poppe & K. Groh (eds), A Conchological Iconography. Hackenheim: Conchbooks. pp. 1–82, pls 104-245.

External links 
 

 
Turbinidae
Gastropod genera